Chak No 226 Jb Bharwana (بھروآنہ) is a village  of district Chiniot in Bhawana Tehsil,  Punjab, Pakistan. It is located on Mangoana Jhang Link Road.

There are two mosques in this village one is located in the Old Area which is known as Purani Abadi under the priesthood (Imamat) Of Qari Muhammad Dilawar while the other is located in the New Area which is also known as New Abadi.

Education
Two Govt Primary schools for boys and girls are located in Village. And one Private school Al Ameeq Memorial Public School is also build for proper education as well as islamic education for children of Village

Constituency

Union Council UC36, Chairman Mahar Muhammad Nawaz Bharwana Belongs to this Village.

Mahar Wajid Ali Bharwana, Inspector Punjab Police is a notable Person of this Village

Villages in Chiniot District